The 1937 Gent–Wevelgem was the fourth edition of the Gent–Wevelgem cycle race and was held on 13 May 1937. The race started in Ghent and finished in Wevelgem. The race was won by Robert Van Eenaeme.

General classification

References

Gent–Wevelgem
1937 in road cycling
1937 in Belgian sport
May 1937 sports events